The Tuscaloosa Seamount is an undersea mountain in the Hawaiian archipelago.

Tuscaloosa Seamount is composed of volcanic rock, but in contrast to the overwhelming majority of seamounts, it is not a submarine volcano. It is a huge block of rocks that broke off about two million years ago at the Nuʻuanu submarine landslide when the volcano Koʻolau collapsed.

References

Seamounts of the Pacific Ocean
Geography of Hawaii